KF Lipjani is a professional football club from Kosovo which competes in the Third League (Group B). The club is based in Lipjan. Their home ground is the Sami Kelmendi Stadium which has a seating capacity of 2,500.

See also
 List of football clubs in Kosovo

References

Football clubs in Kosovo
Association football clubs established in 2019
Lipljan